

Commercial banks
 Advanzia Bank
 Banque de Luxembourg
 
 Banque et Caisse d'Épargne de l'État
 Banque Fortuna
 Banque Havilland
 Banque Internationale à Luxembourg
 Banque Raiffeisen
 Banque Transatlantique Luxembourg
 BGL BNP Paribas
 East-West United Bank
 ING
 Intesa Sanpaolo
 Quintet Private Bank
 Portuguese Commercial Bank
 Société Nationale de Crédit et d'Investissement
 Société Générale
 Eurobank Private Bank Luxembourg

Central bank
 Central Bank of Luxembourg

External links

 
Luxembourg
Banks
Luxembourg